Alex Thompson (born ) is an English former professional rugby league footballer who played for the North Wales Crusaders in Betfred League 1.

He made his first-grade début in Warrington's 44-34 win at home to Harlequins RL in round 27 of 2009's Super League XIV, in which he came off the bench to score a try.

In 2011 Thompson signed a deal with Oldham R.L.F.C. (Heritage № 1290). Thompson was a target for Oldham R.L.F.C. for their 2012 team building operation.

In 2012 Thompson signed a deal with Oxford Rugby League, This was part of a string of signings that included 4 other players and also old manager Tony Benson.

In 2015 Thompson left Oxford because of the departure of Tony Benson and joined the North Wales Crusaders.

References

External links
North Wales Crusaders profile

1990 births
Living people
English rugby league players
North Wales Crusaders players
Oldham R.L.F.C. players
Oxford Rugby League players
Rugby league second-rows
Warrington Wolves players